Ross Township is a township in Taylor County, Iowa, USA.

History
Ross Township was established in 1858. It was named for James Ross, a pioneer settler.

References

Townships in Taylor County, Iowa
Townships in Iowa
1858 establishments in Iowa
Populated places established in 1858